{{safesubst:#invoke:RfD||2=Pathaan|month = January
|day = 29
|year = 2023
|time = 02:57
|timestamp = 20230129025733

|content=
REDIRECT Pashtuns

}}